Svetlana Yevgenyevna Tynkova (born 6 August 1993) is a Kyrgyzstani international footballer who plays as a defender.

International goals

External links 
 

1993 births
Living people
Kyrgyzstani women's footballers
Kyrgyzstan women's international footballers
Women's association football defenders
Kyrgyzstani people of Russian descent